The Bulletin of Earthquake Engineering is a bimonthly peer-reviewed scientific journal published by Springer Science+Business Media on behalf of the European Association for Earthquake Engineering. It covers all aspects of earthquake engineering. It was established in 2003 and the editor-in-chief is Atilla Ansal (Ozyegin University).

Abstracting and indexing
This journal is abstracted and indexed in:

According to the Journal Citation Reports, the journal has a 2020 impact factor of 3.827.

References

External links 
 

Earthquake engineering
Springer Science+Business Media academic journals
Quarterly journals
English-language journals
Engineering journals
Publications established in 2003